The Angels of Borsellino is a 2003 Italian film written by Ugo Barbàra, Paolo Zucca, Mirco Da Lio, and Massimo Di Martino, and directed by . The film concerns the lives of the Sicilian judges Giovanni Falcone and Paolo Borsellino.

Plot
Emanuela is a police bodyguard in charge of escorting judge Paolo Borsellino. In the film she speaks about her work and her fears during the 57 days (13 May to 19 July 1992) between the murder of Giovanni Falcone, and that of Borsellino.

Cast

 Brigitta Boccoli: Emanuela Loi
 Benedicta Boccoli: Emanuela's sister
 : Paolo Borsellino
 Pino Insegno: Agostino Catalano
 : Eddie Cosina
 Vincenzo Ferrera: Vincenzo Li Muli
 : Claudio Traina
 Francesco Guzzo: Antonio Vullo
 Sebastiano Lo Monaco: Chief inspector 
 Ernesto Mahieux: Vincenzi

External links

  Gli angeli di Borsellino on Coming Soon

2003 films
2003 drama films
Italian drama films
2000s Italian-language films
Films set in 1992
Films set in Italy
Films set in Palermo
2000s Italian films